Anopinella triquetra is a species of moth of the family Tortricidae. It is found in Guatemala. Specimens from Honduras and Costa Rica might be two separate species.

The length of the fore wings is 7–9.5 mm. The forewings are whitish with a slight ochreous tinge. The hindwings are tawny grey.

References

External links
Systematic revision of Anopinella Powell (Lepidoptera: Tortricidae: Euliini) and phylogenetic analysis of the Apolychrosis group of genera

Anopinella
Moths of Central America
Moths described in 1914